The Josiah Smith Tennent House is a historic house in Charleston, South Carolina. The house was built by Josiah Smith Tennent in 1859 and placed on the National Register of Historic Places in 1979.

In 1993, the city gave the property known as the Josiah Smith Tennent House to nonprofit Elpis Inc. At the time, the house was little more than a shell, and the nonprofit intended to restore the building as a community center. A restoration followed, aided by the community development grants from the city, private donations estimated in the millions, and a $1.73 million mortgage that Elpis took out on the building in 2003. The restoration received a South Carolina Historic Preservation Award in 2004.

Elpis outfitted part of the building as a dental clinic, helped established a day care center there, and housed other nonprofit groups in the building. In March 2008, it was announced that Charleston would spend $1.4 million to buy the house when a nonprofit that received more than $1 million in municipal grants toward renovating the building as a community center defaulted on its mortgage.

The small front yard of the building became the Philip Simmons Children's Garden, honoring the master blacksmith.

References

National Register of Historic Places in Charleston, South Carolina
Houses on the National Register of Historic Places in South Carolina
Houses in Charleston, South Carolina